Ahmed Diaa Eddine  (1912–1976) was an Egyptian film director. He directed over 30 films and studied at the Leonardo da Vinci Institute in Cairo.

References

External links
 Filmography at Complete Index to World Film

Egyptian film directors
1912 births
1976 deaths